Uvalda is a city in Montgomery County, Georgia, United States. The population was 439 at the 2020 census, down from 598 in 2010. It is part of the Vidalia Micropolitan Statistical Area.

History
The community derives its name from Juan de Ugalde, a Texas pioneer. The Georgia General Assembly incorporated Uvalda as a town in 1910.

Geography
Uvalda is located in southern Montgomery County at  (32.037903, -82.508789). U.S. Route 221 passes through the center of town, leading north-northwest  to Mount Vernon, the county seat, and south-southwest  to Hazlehurst. Georgia State Route 56 follows US 221 out of Uvalda to the northwest but also leads east  to Reidsville. State Route 135 leads south to Hazlehurst with US 221 and north-northeast  to Higgston.

Milligan Creek flows through the city just east of its center, leading southeast to the Altamaha River.

Demographics

As of the census of 2000, there were 530 people, 201 households, and 147 families residing in the city. The racial makeup of the city was 60.19% White, 38.49% African American, and 1.32% from two or more races. Hispanic or Latino of any race were 1.51% of the population.

There were 201 households, out of which 36.8% had children under the age of 18 living with them, 51.7% were married couples living together, 17.4% had a female householder with no husband present, and 26.4% were non-families. 23.9% of all households were made up of individuals, and 10.9% had someone living alone who was 65 years of age or older. The average household size was 2.64 and the average family size was 3.11.

In the city, the population was spread out, with 28.9% under the age of 18, 7.2% from 18 to 24, 27.5% from 25 to 44, 23.2% from 45 to 64, and 13.2% who were 65 years of age or older. The median age was 35 years. For every 100 females, there were 89.3 males. For every 100 females age 18 and over, there were 83.0 males.

The median income for a household in the city was $31,513, and the median income for a family was $36,806. Males had a median income of $23,750 versus $19,250 for females. The per capita income for the city was $15,217. About 12.9% of families and 19.3% of the population were below the poverty line, including 24.6% of those under age 18 and 23.2% of those age 65 or over.

Notable people
 Wally Moses, Major League Baseball outfielder

References

Cities in Georgia (U.S. state)
Cities in Montgomery County, Georgia
Vidalia, Georgia, micropolitan area